Mohammed al-Qahtani (born 1975) is Saudi Arabian Guantanamo detainee.

Mohammed al-Qahtani may also refer to:

 Mohammad Fahad al-Qahtani (born 1965/1966), Saudi Arabian economics professor
Mohammed Saleh Al Qahtani, Bahraini Board Member of the Boy Scouts of Bahrain
Mohammed Al-Qahtani (footballer, born July 2002) (born 2002), Saudi Arabian footballer
Mohammed Al-Qahtani (footballer, born March 2002) (born 2002), Saudi Arabian footballer for Abha Club

See also
 Qahtan (disambiguation)